Mikael Ekvall (born 18 June 1989) is a Swedish long distance runner. He competed in the men's marathon at the 2017 World Championships in Athletics, placing 32nd with the time of 2:18:12, his season's best. In 2018, he competed in the men's marathon at the 2018 European Athletics Championships held in Berlin, Germany. He did not finish his race. In 2020, he competed in the men's race at the 2020 World Athletics Half Marathon Championships held in Gdynia, Poland.

References

External links

1989 births
Living people
Swedish male long-distance runners
Swedish male marathon runners
World Athletics Championships athletes for Sweden
Place of birth missing (living people)